The 1973–74 Challenge Cup was the 73rd staging of rugby league's oldest knockout competition, the Challenge Cup.

The final was contested by Warrington and Featherstone Rovers at Wembley.

Warrington beat Featherstone Rovers 24-9 at Wembley in front of a crowd of 77,400.

The winner of the Lance Todd Trophy was the Warrington , Derek Whitehead.

Warrington defeated Huddersfield, Huyton, Wigan and Dewsbury to get to the final against Featherstone Rovers.

This was Warrington’s fourth Cup final win in ten Final appearances.

Warrington's full-back Derek Whitehead won the Lance Todd Trophy for man-of-the-match.

First round

Second round

Quarter-finals

Semi-finals

Final

References

External links
Challenge Cup official website 
Challenge Cup 1973/74 results at Rugby League Project

Challenge Cup
Challenge Cup